I figli di nessuno (internationally released as Nobody's Children) is an Italian drama film directed by Bruno Gaburro and released in 1974. The film is part of the genre of Italian melodramatic films known as "tearjerker movies" or "lacrima movies". It is the remake of Raffaello Matarazzo's I Figli di nessuno.

Cast
Gabriele Tinti: Guido Canali  
Sara Sperati: Luisa Fanti / Sister Adorata  
Erika Blanc: Countess Canali 
 Chris Avram: Anselmo Vannini 
Gino Santercole 
Cinzia De Carolis

References

External links

I figli di nessuno at Variety Distribution

1974 films
1970s Italian-language films
Italian drama films
1974 drama films
Films scored by Carlo Savina
Films directed by Bruno Gaburro
1970s Italian films